Giulio Cesare Monteverdi (1573–1630/31) was an Italian composer and organist. He was the younger brother of Claudio Monteverdi.

He entered the service of the Duke of Mantua in 1602, but was dismissed in 1612.  He then worked in Crema and became maestro di cappella at the cathedral of Salò in 1620.

In 1611 he wrote an opera, Il rapimento di Proserpina (The rape of Proserpine), which was staged in Mantua. The music and text are lost, but it appears that it shared only the story line of Claudio's later opera Proserpina rapita (1630), which is also lost. He published a collection of motets in Venice in 1620 and a few other works, including two pieces which were included in Claudio's 1607 Scherzi musicali. He probably died of the plague in 1630 or 1631.

References
Notes

Sources
 Arnold, Denis (n.d.). "Monteverdi, Giulio Cesare", in Grove Music Online, accessed 28 September 2017. 
Carter, Tim (2002). Monteverdi's Musical Theatre''. New Haven and London: Yale University Press.

External links
 

1573 births
1630s deaths
17th-century Italian composers
Italian male composers
Italian organists
Male organists
Musicians from Cremona
Italian opera composers
Male opera composers
17th-century deaths from plague (disease)
17th-century male musicians